How Country Feels is the third studio album by American country music artist Randy Houser. It was released on January 22, 2013, through Stoney Creek Records. Houser wrote seven of the album's fifteen tracks. The album was produced by Derek George, a former member of the bands Pearl River and Williams Riley. The album's first single, the title track, became Houser's first Number One song on the Billboard Country Airplay chart. Its second single, "Runnin' Outta Moonlight", was released to country radio on March 4, 2013. Both singles were certified Platinum by the RIAA. The album's third single, "Goodnight Kiss", was released to country radio on September 23, 2013. The album's fourth single, "Like a Cowboy", was released to country radio on May 19, 2014. The third and fourth singles were certified Gold.

The album had sold 228,000 copies in the US as of January 2015.

Content
The album features a duet with Kristy Lee Cook on "Wherever Love Goes," which was later re-recorded and released in August 2013 as a single with Cook as the lead artist and Houser as the featured artist.

Critical reception
Giving How Country Feels an A-minus, Tammy Ragusa of Country Weekly praised the "authenticity" of Houser's voice and said that the "project is overflowing with hooky, singalong tracks."  Taste of Country gave the album four stars out of five, saying that it was an "even effort with no bruises, but few moments that take your breath away," and saying Houser proved he "is one of country music’s top male vocalists."

Track listing

Personnel
Musicians

 Tom Bukovac – electric guitar
 Vanessa Campagna – background vocals
 Kristy Lee Cook – background vocals on "Wherever Love Goes"
 J.T. Corenflos – electric guitar
 Derek George – acoustic guitar, electric guitar, harmonica, keyboards, background vocals
 Lee Hendricks – bass guitar
 Wes Hightower – background vocals
 Randy Houser – lead vocals
 Mike Johnson – pedal steel guitar
 Troy Lancaster – electric guitar
 B. James Lowry – acoustic guitar
 Rob McNelley – electric guitar
 James Mitchell – electric guitar
 Steve Nathan – keyboards
 Mickey Raphael – harmonica
 Michael Rhodes – bass guitar
 Russell Terrell – background vocals
 Scotty Sanders – pedal steel guitar
 John Henry Trinko – keyboards
 Lonnie Wilson – drums, percussion
 Casey Wood – accordion, keyboards, percussion

Technical
 Derek George – editing, engineer, producer, programming
 Larry Hall – string arrangements
 Andrew Mendelson – mastering
 Mike Molinar – production coordinator
 Elijah Sandoval – assistant engineer
 Casey Wood – editing, engineer, mixing, production coordinator

Chart performance

Album

Certifications

References

2013 albums
Randy Houser albums
BBR Music Group albums
Albums produced by Derek George